The Lithuanian A Lyga 2001 was the 12th season of top-tier football in Lithuania. The season started on 1 April 2001 and ended on 11 November 2001. 10 teams participated with FBK Kaunas winning the championship.

League standings

Results

First half of season

Second half of season

See also 
 2001 LFF Lyga

References 

LFF Lyga seasons
1
Lith
Lith